This page gives a list of rides of the Dutch roller coaster manufacturer Vekoma.

As of 2022, there are over 429 roller coasters around the world from Vekoma, some of which are either under construction or have been removed.

References

Vekoma